The Medusa Tour was a concert tour by Elton John that lasted from 1999 to 2000. The tour was a continuation of the previous tour, An Evening with Elton John. The tour started on 23 September 1999 in Jacksonville, Florida and came to an end on 10 December 2000 in Montgomery, Alabama.

After visiting Europe in the summer of 2000, Elton John and the band performed Greatest Hits Live. This was a set of three concerts, two of which were at Madison Square Garden in New York City. The two shows at Madison Square Garden were recorded and released as Elton John One Night Only – The Greatest Hits.

Tour dates

Set lists

References

External links

 Information Site with Tour Dates

Elton John concert tours
1999 concert tours
2000 concert tours